Nissi Parish was a rural municipality in northern Estonia. It was a part of Harju County. The current mayor is Peedo Kessel.

Administrative centre of the municipality was Riisipere small borough. There was also Turba small borough and 17 villages in Nissi Parish: Aude, Ellamaa, Jaanika, Kivitammi, Lehetu, Lepaste, Madila, Munalaskme, Mustu, Nurme, Odulemma, Rehemäe, Siimika, Tabara, Ürjaste, Vilumäe, Viruküla.

References

External links